Hannah Blilie is the drummer of the American R&B band Chanti Darling and formerly Gossip and Shoplifting. She has also performed with Sarah Dougher, Chromatics, Stiletto, Mr Yuk, The Lumpies, Vade, The Vogue, and Soiled Doves. Her twin brother, Jordan Blilie, was one of the two lead vocalists of now-defunct The Blood Brothers. A photo of Blilie is featured on the cover artwork for the Gossip's fourth studio album Music for Men.

In 2003, Blilie replaced Kathy Mendonca as the drummer of Gossip, and her drumming appears on their LP Standing In The Way Of Control (2006). She also plays on the Gossip album Live in Liverpool.

References

External links
After Ellen interview with Hannah Blilie, Oct 2007

1981 births
American rock drummers
American women drummers
American lesbian musicians
Living people
21st-century American women musicians
21st-century American drummers
20th-century American LGBT people
21st-century American LGBT people